The Reno Air Defense Sector (ReADS) is an inactive United States Air Force organization.  Its last assignment was with the 28th Air Division, being stationed at Stead Air Force Base, Nevada.

History
ReADS was established in February 1959 assuming control of former ADC Western Air Defense Force units in Nevada, most of Oregon east of the Cascade Range; southwestern Idaho and areas of California east of the Sierra Nevada and the northern Central Valley.   The organization provided command and control over several aircraft and radar squadrons.

On 15 February the new Semi Automatic Ground Environment (SAGE) Direction Center (DC-16) became operational.    DC-16  was equipped with dual AN/FSQ-7 Computers.   The day-to-day operations of the command was to train and maintain tactical flying units flying jet interceptor aircraft (F-94 Starfire; F-102 Delta Dagger; F-106 Delta Dart) in a state of readiness with training missions and series of exercises with SAC and other units simulating interceptions of incoming enemy aircraft.

The Sector was inactivated on 1 April 1966 as part of an ADC consolidation and reorganization; and its units were reassigned to the 26th Air Division.

Lineage
 Established as Reno Air Defense Sector on 15 February 1959
 Inactivated on 1 April 1966

Assignments
 25th Air Division, 15 February 1959
 28th Air Division, 1 July 1960 – 1 April 1966

Stations
 Stead AFB, Nevada, 15 February 1959 – 1 April 1966

Components

Radar squadrons
 634th Radar Squadron
 Burns AFS, Oregon, 15 September 1960-1 April 1966
 658th Aircraft Control and Warning Squadron
 Winnemucca AFS, Nevada, 15 September 1960-1 April 1966
 821st Radar Squadron
 Baker AFS, Oregon, 15 September 1960-1 April 1966
 858th Radar Squadron
 Fallon AFS, Nevada, 15 September 1960-1 April 1966
 866th Radar Squadron
 Tonopah AFS, Nevada, 15 September 1960-1 April 1966

See also

 List of USAF Aerospace Defense Command General Surveillance Radar Stations
 Aerospace Defense Command Fighter Squadrons

References

  A Handbook of Aerospace Defense Organization 1946 - 1980,  by Lloyd H. Cornett and Mildred W. Johnson, Office of History, Aerospace Defense Center, Peterson Air Force Base, Colorado
 Winkler, David F. (1997), Searching the skies: the legacy of the United States Cold War defense radar program. Prepared for United States Air Force Headquarters Air Combat Command.
 Maurer, Maurer (1983). Air Force Combat Units Of World War II. Maxwell AFB, Alabama: Office of Air Force History. .
 Ravenstein, Charles A. (1984). Air Force Combat Wings Lineage and Honors Histories 1947–1977. Maxwell AFB, Alabama: Office of Air Force History. .
 Radomes.org Reno Air Defense Sector

Re
1959 establishments in Nevada
1966 disestablishments in Nevada